Ana Rita Joana Iracema e Carolina is the second studio album from Brazilian singer Ana Carolina, available in 2001, has the participation of Alcione (Violão e Voz) and Claudia Raia (Dadivosa). It sold 250 000 in Brazil, being certified platinum.

Track list

Certifications

References

2001 albums